Martin Koolhoven's Schnitzel Paradise is a 2005 Dutch comedy film about Dutch-Moroccan Nordip Dounia who starts working in a restaurant kitchen and falls in love with Agnes Meerman, niece of the hotel's manager. Nordip has to overcome not only Agnes's family's prejudices but also his father's wishes as to his future.

The film was a huge success in The Netherlands (it was the highest grossing Dutch film in 2005 in The Netherlands).

Cast
 Mounir Valentyn  as Nordip Dounia
 Bracha van Doesburgh as Agnes Meerman
 Mimoun Oaïssa as Amimoen
 Yahya Gaier as Mo
 Tygo Gernandt as Goran
 Gürkan Küçüksentürk as Ali
 Micha Hulshof as Sander
 Frank Lammers as Willem
 Sabri Saad El-Hamus as Mr. Doenia
 Nezha Karim as Mrs. Doenia
 Mohammed Chaara as Nadir Dounia
 Linda van Dyck as Nina Meerman
 Sanne Vogel as Claudia

Awards
 Film Discovery Jury Award - U.S. Comedy Arts Festival - Won
 Best Performance in a Foreign Film won by Micha Hulshof
 Golden Film (100,000 visitors) - Won
 Skip City International D-Cinema Festival Award for Best Screenplay - Won
 Golden Calf for Best Director - Nominated
 Golden Calf for Best Editing - Nominated
 Golden Calf for Best Production Design - Nominated
 Golden Calf for Best Supporting Actor - Won

The Best Supporting Actor Golden Calf was shared by supporting actors Yahya Gaier, Tygo Gernandt, Micha Hulshof, Gürkan Küçüksentürk and Mimoun Oaïssa

External links

interview with Martin Koolhovenabout Schnitzel Paradise on European-films.net 
review of Schnitzel Paradiseon European-films.net 
Variety review of Schnitzel Paradise by Eddie Cockrell

2005 films
2005 comedy films
2000s Dutch-language films
Films based on Dutch novels
Films set in the Netherlands
Films directed by Martin Koolhoven
Dutch comedy films